Christos Donis (born 9 October 1994) is a Greek professional footballer who plays as a midfielder for Polish club Radomiak Radom.

Career

Panathinaikos
Donis is a product of Panathinaikos' youth ranks. He promoted to the first team on July 1, 2012, signing a contract which keeps him in Panathinaikos until 2015. He made his debut at the 4–0 win against Proodeftiki for the Greek Cup. He made his championship debut at a game against Levadiakos on the 18th of December 2013, scoring his first goal with the team.

On 15 February 2016, Panathinaikos officially announced the loan of Christos Donis to Swiss club Lugano until the end of the season, with a contract option to purchase him. The 21-year-old midfielder wοuld have his younger brother, Tasos (who joined Zdeněk Zeman’s team on loan from Juventus), as a teammate.
On 27 June 2016, after an unsuccessful semester with Lugano, his club officially announced his loan to the Superleague club PAS Giannina until the end of the 2016–17 season. On 29 November 2016, he scored the only goal in a 1–0 away Greek Cup win against Agrotikos Asteras, helping his club to proceed to the last 16. In January 2017 he was transferred to Iraklis, on loan. On 5 April 2017, he was the only scorer in a crucial 1–0 home win game against Levadiakos, sealing a crucial victory in his club effort to avoid relegation. On 9 April 2017, he scored for a consecutive game sealing a valuable 2–1 away win against his former club PAS Giannina in his club's constant effort to avoid relegation. On 30 April 2017, he helped his club to sealing a 2–2 away draw against Asteras Tripolis, with a wonderful free kick, concluded his exceptional performance in the second half of the 2016–17 season.

Donis returned to Panathinaikos for the 2017–18 season. On 21 January 2018, he opened the score in a hammering 4–0 home win game against Kerkyra. It was his first goal with the club after almost four years. On 6 April 2019, he scored his first goal for the 2018–19 season was in the right place at the right time to convert an excellent pass from Italian striker Federico Macheda, as Panathinaikos moved to within five points of fifth-placed Aris after claiming a solid 2–0 home win over the Thessaloniki club at the Olympic Stadium. On 12 January 2020, he scored his first goal for the 2019–20 season as he intercepted the ball from a poor clearance made by Panionios defence, and he surged forward before hitting a powerful diagonal shot past the goalkeeper, Jérémy Malherbe to open the score in a 3–0 home win game against Panionios.

Ascoli
On 16 September 2020, he signed a three years' contract with Italian Serie B club Ascoli, on a free transfer with annual fees at the range of €300,000. On 12 February 2022, Donis' contract with Ascoli was terminated by mutual consent.

VVV-Venlo 
On 19 January 2021, he was loaned to VVV-Venlo, where he reunited with his brother Tasos.

Radomiak
On 24 January 2023, after spending most of the winter training with Polish Ekstraklasa side Radomiak Radom, Donis signed with them until the end of the season, with a two-year extension option.

Personal life
Donis is the son of the former professional footballer and current manager, Giorgos Donis. His younger brother, Tasos, plays for French club Stade de Reims.

Career statistics

Honours
Panathinaikos
 Greek Cup: 2013–14

References

External links

1994 births
Living people
Greece under-21 international footballers
Greece youth international footballers
Greek expatriate footballers
FC Lugano players
PAS Giannina F.C. players
Iraklis Thessaloniki F.C. players
Panathinaikos F.C. players
Ascoli Calcio 1898 F.C. players
VVV-Venlo players
Radomiak Radom players
Super League Greece players
Swiss Super League players
Serie B players
Eredivisie players

Expatriate footballers in Switzerland
Expatriate footballers in Italy
Expatriate footballers in the Netherlands
Expatriate footballers in Poland
Greek expatriate sportspeople in Switzerland
Greek expatriate sportspeople in Italy
Greek expatriate sportspeople in the Netherlands
Greek expatriate sportspeople in Poland
Association football midfielders
Footballers from Athens
Greek footballers